Valdimarsson is an Icelandic patronymic surname, literally meaning "son of Valdimar". People with the last name include:

Hannibal Valdimarsson (1903–1991), Icelandic politician
Helgi Valdimarsson (born 1936), Icelandic scientist
Þórarinn Ingi Valdimarsson (born 1990), Icelandic footballer

See also
Valdimar
Waldemar / Valdemar

Icelandic-language surnames